De Graaff's soft-furred mouse (Praomys degraaffi) is a species of rodent in the family Muridae.
It is found in Burundi, Rwanda, and Uganda.
Its natural habitat is subtropical or tropical moist montane forests.
It is threatened by habitat loss.

References

Praomys
Mammals described in 1999
Taxonomy articles created by Polbot